John Keawe is a Hawaiian musician and slack key guitar player from Hāwī in the North Kohala district of the Big Island of Hawaii. He's most known for his song "Puuanahulu", but also for "Hawaii Island.. Is My Home" and "Waimanalo Blues".

He has toured throughout Hawaii and the Mainland U.S. and regularly performs on the Big Island.  Keawe has released a series of albums on his Homestead Records Label, and can also be heard on the Grammy Winning album "Slack Key Guitar Volume 2" available on Palm Records.

External links
 John Keawe's Website

Guitarists from Hawaii
Slack-key guitarists
Living people
Year of birth missing (living people)
Place of birth missing (living people)
American male guitarists